is a US-born former Japanese professional basketball player and the former Head coach of the Tokyo Excellence.

Head coaching record

|- 
|-

References

1966 births
Living people
Alvark Tokyo players
Santa Clara Broncos men's basketball players
Tokyo Excellence coaches
Yokohama Excellence players
Toyotsu Fighting Eagles Nagoya players
American men's basketball players